Ivan Cyrus Wettengel (1876 – February 19, 1935) was a United States Navy captain who served as the 25th Naval Governor of Guam. A graduate of the United States Naval Academy, Wettengel commanded a number of ships. He received the Navy Cross for his command of  during World War I. He also commanded  and the Naval Training Station Hampton Roads. During his tenure as governor, he overturned many of the unpopular policies of William Gilmer. He also attempted to assemble a bull-mounted Guam Cavalry, but the initiative failed. A number of locations in Guam are named in his honor.

Life
Wettengel was born in Illinois in 1876. At the time of his appointment to the Naval Academy he lived in Colorado.

Career
Wettengel graduated from the United States Naval Academy in 1896. Ensign Wettengel served aboard . He commanded  in 1900. In 1902, while a lieutenant, he saw duty aboard . In 1914, he served aboard  as a lieutenant commander. He commanded  during World War I, for which he received the Navy Cross. 

In 1917, Wettengel was promoted to the rank of captain.

On April 12, 1918, Wettengel commanded .

He commanded  from May 22, 1924, until September 28, 1925, when he became commander of Naval Training Station Hampton Roads. He retired at the rank of captain.

Governorship

Wettengel served as Naval Governor of Guam from July 7, 1920 to February 27, 1921. He overturned many of the policies of William Gilmer, the widely criticized and dislike governor immediately prior to him. During his tenure, the Navy opened the first naval aviation station on the island at Orote Peninsula. He attempted a military experiment during his time in office by forming the Guam Cavalry. These units rode mounted bulls but the idea was abandoned when the bulls proved untrainable. He endorsed increasing medical aid to the island in an effort to in improving the "civilizing and Americanization" of the Chamorro people by making health care and sanitation more widespread.

Personal life 
Wettengel's wife died on December 13, 1927 while he was stationed at the Mare Island Naval Shipyard.

Legacy
A number of locations on Guam are named in Wettengel's honor. Wettengel Elementary School, opened in 1968 in Dededo, Guam, briefly held the Eloy Q. Benavente Elementary School in 2008 before protest led school officials to re-affirm its original name in honor of Wettengel. Wettengel Rugby Field is also named in his honor. Okkodo High School used to be known as Wettengel High School.

References

External links 
 Ivan Cyrus Wettengel at findagrave.com

1876 births
1935 deaths
Governors of Guam
People from Illinois
Military personnel from Colorado
United States Naval Academy alumni
Cavalry commanders
Recipients of the Navy Cross (United States)